Dockrill is a surname. People with that name include:

 Edward Dockrill (1838–1927), New Zealand politician
 Laura Dockrill (born 1986), English performance poet, author, illustrator and short story writer
 Michelle Dockrill (born 1959), politician from Nova Scotia, Canada
 Saki Dockrill (1952–2009), Japanese-British historian of modern international affairs

See also